Pat Tafa (born 19 July 1999 in Australia) is an Australian rugby union player who plays for the New South Wales Waratahs in Super Rugby. His playing position is flanker. He has signed for the Waratahs squad in 2019.

Reference list

External links
Rugby.com.au profile
itsrugby.co.uk profile

1999 births
Australian rugby union players
Living people
People educated at Brisbane State High School
Rugby union flankers
Rugby union locks
Rugby union number eights
New South Wales Country Eagles players
New South Wales Waratahs players
Green Rockets Tokatsu players
Hanazono Kintetsu Liners players